Events in the year 1674 in Norway.

Incumbents
Monarch: Christian V

Events
14 October - Finn-Kirsten was executed by burning at the stake. She was the last person to be executed for witchcraft in Trøndelag.

Arts and literature

Vilnes Church was built.

Births

Deaths

29 March - Ove Bjelke, Chancellor of Norway (born 1611).
14 October - Finn-Kirsten, alleged witch.

See also

References